Amanda Brotchie, born in Melbourne, Victoria), is an Australian director known for Picnic at Hanging Rock (2018), Mr Black (2019), Girlboss (2017), and Lowdown (2010-2012). She is also a writer, producer and linguist.

Career
Brotchie co-created the multi-award winning series Lowdown (ABC, BBC 4), through the company High Wire Films, which she founded with producer, Nicole Minchin, and her husband, writer, producer and actor, Adam Zwar.

Other TV shows Brotchie has directed include Picnic at Hanging Rock (Showcase, Amazon), Girlboss (Netflix), A Place to Call Home (Showcase, Acorn TV), The Letdown Series 2 (ABC, Netflix), Squinters (ABC), and Mr Black (Network 10), created by Adam Zwar, which she wrote on and set up.

Theatre credits include The Inner Sanctum, which she directed, and Headlock, which she wrote and directed, and which was nominated for a Green Room Award for Writing.

Brotchie directed the multi-award-winning short film Break & Enter (1999). Her awards include an AFI award for Best Short Film, and the Film Critics Circle of Australia Award for Best Short Film. Break & Enter screened at numerous international festivals and, rare for a short film, had a cinema release in Australia through Palace Cinemas, supporting Happy, Texas.

Brotchie has a PhD in Linguistics, from the University of Melbourne. In researching her PhD, she lived in a remote village on an island in Vanuatu, filming and documenting the local language and culture.

Filmography
The Letdown (2019) (2 episodes)
Mr Black (TV Series) (2019) (4, episodes, set up director)
A Place to Call Home (2018) (2 episodes)
Picnic at Hanging Rock (2018) (1 episode)
Squinters (2018-2019) (12 episodes)
Girlboss (2018) (2 episodes)
This is Littleton (2014) (4 episodes)
Zuzu & the Supernuffs (2013) (8 episodes)
Lowdown (2010-2012) (16 episodes)

Awards and nominations
 Screen Producers Australia Awards: This Is Littleton nominated for Best Comedy Series (2014)
 The AWGIE Awards: This is Littleton nominated for Best Television Comedy (2014)
 New York Television Festival: Bronze Award for Lowdown Series 2 (2013)
 New York Television Festival: Gold Award for Lowdown Series 1 (2011)
 AWGIE (Australian Writers Guild) Award: Best Comedy – Situation or Narrative for Lowdown. Episode 3 – "One Fine Gay". Won with Adam Zwar and Trudy Hellier (2012)
 Monte Carlo Television Festival: Best International TV Comedy (Lowdown nominated) (2013)
 Accolade Competition: Award for Excellence in Comedy – Lowdown
 Accolade Competition: Award of Merit in Direction –  Amanda Brotchie
 AWGIE (Australian Writers Guild) Award: Best Comedy – Situation or Narrative for Lowdown. Episode 7 – "Who's Your Baddy?" Won with Adam Zwar (2010)
 Australian Film Institute Awards: Best Television Comedy Series – Lowdown (2010) (Nominated)
 Australian Directors Guild Awards: Best Direction in Television Comedy – Amanda Brotchie (2010) (Nominated)
Australian Film Institute Awards: Best Short Fiction Film. Break & Enter 
Film Critics Circle of Australia: Best Short Fiction Film. Break & Enter 
 The Green Room Awards (Theatre): Outstanding Achievement in Writing (2002) – Headlock (Nominated)

References

External links
 

Australian film directors
Australian women film directors
Living people
Year of birth missing (living people)